J. Harold Ellens (16 July 1932 — 13 April 2018) was a psychologist and theologian. He was the founding editor of the Journal of Psychology and Christianity and also the Executive Director of the Christian Association for Psychological Studies International from 1974 to 1989. He was one of the key figures in psychological biblical criticism and served as Chair of the Psychology and Biblical Studies Section of the Society of Biblical Literature.

Education
Ellens received multiple educational degrees:
PhD in Second Temple Judaism and Christian Origins, Department of Near Eastern Studies, University of Michigan, 2009
PhD, Psychology of Human Communications, Wayne State University, 1970
Master's degree in Second Temple Judaism and Christian Origins, NES, University of Michigan, 2002
Master's degree in New Testament and Christian Origins, Princeton Theological Seminary, 1965
Master's degree in Divinity in Theology and Biblical Studies, Calvin Theological Seminary, 1986
Bachelor of Divinity Degree in Theology and Biblical Studies, Calvin Theological Seminary, 1956
Bachelor of Arts Degree in Philosophy and Classics, Calvin College, 1953
Military graduate of the Army Chaplain Staff College, of the Command and General Staff College, of the Industrial College of the Armed Forces, of the Army Special Warfare School (Civil Affairs), of the US Army War College, and of the National Defense University

Ellens was an ordained Christian minister (ordained 24 June 1956) and maintained a private practice in psychotherapy which began in 1965. As a psychotherapist, he was licensed in the State of Michigan and was certified by the National Board for Certified Counselors.

Publications
Ellens published more than 160 professional journal articles and served as author, co-author, or editor of 181 books.

Selected works

Books

Edited by

References

External links
J. Harold Ellens personal website and biography

1932 births
2018 deaths
20th-century American psychologists
Calvin University alumni
Horace H. Rackham School of Graduate Studies alumni
University of Kansas alumni
Psychologists of religion
Princeton Theological Seminary alumni
Army Men
National Defense University alumni
Dwight D. Eisenhower School for National Security and Resource Strategy alumni
United States Army War College alumni
New Testament scholars